Keyzer & De Boer Advocaten is a Dutch drama television series produced by KRO and NCRV.

The show is centered around the events in a small attorney office in Amsterdam-Zuid, Netherlands.

History 

The show first aired in October 2005 on Nederland 1. The show was popular with each episode being watched by almost 1.5 million people.

In season 3 this declined to around half a million viewers when the show moved to the Nederland 2 channel.

Cast

References

External links 
 

2005 Dutch television series debuts
2008 Dutch television series endings
2000s Dutch television series
Dutch drama television series
Dutch-language television shows
NPO 1 original programming